Grójec  is a town in Poland, located in the Masovian Voivodeship, about  south of Warsaw. It is the capital of the urban-rural administrative district Grójec and Grójec County. It has 16,674 inhabitants (2017). Grójec surroundings are considered to be the biggest apple-growing area of Poland. It is said that the region makes up also for the biggest apple orchard of Europe. Statistically, every third apple sold in Poland is grown in Grójec – a unique local microclimate provides for their beautiful red colour.

History
In the 11th and 12th centuries, Grójec was the seat of a castellany, which was then moved to Czersk. It was granted town rights in 1419 by Duke Janusz I of Warsaw from the Piast dynasty.

World War II

In September 1939, during the joint German-Soviet invasion of Poland which started World War II, the town was bombed by the Luftwaffe and afterwards captured by Germany. In November 1940, during the Nazi occupation of Poland, German authorities established a Jewish ghetto in Grójec, in order to confine its Jewish population for the purpose of persecution and exploitation. From there, most inmates were sent to Treblinka extermination camp. Only a group of Jewish craftsmen was left in Grójec, however, they were also annihilated in a mass execution in Dębówka, near Góra Kalwaria. German occupation of Grójec ended in January 1945.

Nature

Forest Inspectorate Reserves 
There are nine nature reserves in the Grójec Forest Inspectorate, whose total area exceeds 1 thousand hectares.

The following are forest reserves that cover a part of the forested area: Dąbrowa Radziejowska, a 52.50 hectare reserve in a large forest complex in the Radziejowice commune, was created in 1984 to preserve and protect luminous oak wood; Osuchowskie Grądy, a 99,25 hectare  reserve was established in 1982 and is at the highest point of the Mazowiecka lowland; Skulski Las, a 311.75 hectare partial forest reserve established in 1984 and includes most of the Skuły Wschód range, situated in the Skuły-Wschód forestry unit; and Skulskie Oaks, a 30,07 hectare partial forest reserve of the area of established in 1996, covering the north-western part of the Skuły-Western range and belonging to the Grójec Forest Inspectorate.

The Łęgacz Nad Jeziorka 37.31 hectare reserve is situated by the Jeziorka River, several hundred meters to the north-west of Głuchów village. The protected area covers a fragment of the river valley and a riparian forest growing on its right bank and marshy bottom of the valley.

The Lakes of Olszyna nature reserve was established by the Ministry of the Environment on 25 January 1995. The forest reserve is in the southern part of the lake district on the Jeziorka River and has a total area is 5.83 hectares, including 4.99 hectares of forest.

The Modrzewina forest reserve was established in 1959 on the grounds of the village of Mała Wieś in the commune of Belsk Duży to protect the northernmost site of Polish larch in the Highland, which grow in this area to a height of 40 meters and up to 120 cm in circumference.

Tomczyce is a landscape reserve of 57.99 hectare, established in 1968, located between the villages of Gostomia and Tomczyce to the east of Nowe Miasto. The reserve protects the steep slope of the Pilica valley, cut by several ravines and overgrown by an old pine-oak forest. The valley slopes from a height of 20 meters to the river, which remains steep due to erosion of the riverbank, running along the foot of the slope and undercutting it periodically.

The Sokół forest reserve was established in 1995 in the commune of Wyśmierzyce to protect the area of forests, meadows and marshes and preserve the plant complexes with the dominant mountain ash for scientific and educational purposes.

Within the territorial range of Grójec Forest Inspectorate there are four Landscape Protection Areas along the picturesque and ecologically important river valleys, namely, the Jeziorka River Valley, Pilica and Drzewiczka River Valley; Bolimowsko Radziejowicki with the Central Rawka River Valley and the Chojnatka River Valley.

Sports 
It competes in the lower leagues.

Notable people
 Piotr Skarga (1536–1612), Polish Jesuit, preacher, hagiographer and polemicist.
 Asher Rabinowicz of Przedbórz (ca.1720–1798) an 18th-century Hasidic Maggid (preacher).
 Jan Jagmin-Sadowski (1895–1977), a general of the Polish Army
 Marek Suski (born 1958), a Polish politician
 Justyna Kozdryk (born 1980, a Polish Paralympic powerlifter
 Bartłomiej Niedziela (born 1985), a Polish footballer with over 250 club caps

International relations

Twin towns – Sister cities
Grójec is twinned with:

 Spišská Nová Ves, Slovakia
 Strumica, North Macedonia
 Canosa di Puglia, Italy
 Horki, Belarus

See also
 Grojec (disambiguation)

Notes and references

Grójec city government webpage
 Jewish Community in Grójec on Virtual Shtetl

Cities and towns in Masovian Voivodeship
Grójec County
Masovia
Masovian Voivodeship (1526–1795)
Warsaw Governorate
Warsaw Voivodeship (1919–1939)
Holocaust locations in Poland